Nancy York is an American politician serving as a member of the South Dakota House of Representatives from the 5th district. First elected in 2016, she assumed office on January 10, 2017 and serves on the health and local government committees.

Prior to her election to the South Dakota legislature she served on the Watertown city council.

References

External links
 Project Vote Smart page for Nancy York

Living people
Year of birth missing (living people)
Republican Party members of the South Dakota House of Representatives
Women state legislators in South Dakota
21st-century American politicians
21st-century American women politicians